Esther Before Ahasuerus may refer to:
Esther Before Ahasuerus (Tintoretto)
Esther Before Ahasuerus (Artemisia Gentileschi)